Teofil Stredie (born 6 March 1958) is a Romanian former footballer who played as a central defender.

Honours
Dinamo București
 Divizia A: 1981–82, 1982–83
 Cupa României: 1981–82
Victoria București
Divizia B: 1984–85

Notes

References

1958 births
Living people
Romanian footballers
Olympic footballers of Romania
Association football defenders
Liga I players
Liga II players
FC Dinamo București players
CS Corvinul Hunedoara players
Victoria București players